Sorte Nula is a Portuguese film directed by Fernando Fragata. It stars António Feio and was the highest-grossing Portuguese film in 2004.

Sorte Nula was released in December 9th, 2004 and in 2005 the film won an award for Best Cinematography at the Boston International Film Festival.

References

External links 

2000s mystery films
2004 films
Portuguese drama films